Baldwin II ( 865 – 10 September 918) was the second margrave (or count) of Flanders, ruling from 879 to 918. He was nicknamed  the Bald (Calvus) after his maternal grandfather, Emperor Charles the Bald.

Rule
Baldwin II was born around 865 to Margrave Baldwin I of Flanders and Judith, daughter of Emperor Charles the Bald. The early years of Baldwin II's rule were marked by a series of devastating Viking raids into Flanders. By 883, he was forced to move north to Pagus Flandransis, which became the territory most closely associated with the Counts of Flanders. Baldwin constructed a series of wooden fortifications at Saint-Omer, Bruges, Ghent, and Kortrijk. He then seized lands that were abandoned by royal and ecclesiastical officials. Many of these same citadels later formed castellanies which housed government, militia, and local courts.

In 888, the Western Frankish king, Charles the Fat, was deposed, leaving several candidates vying to replace him. As a grandson of Charles the Bald, who was king of West Francia, Baldwin could have competed for the crown. Instead, Baldwin and others tried to convince the East Frankish king, Arnulf, to take the West Frankish crown, but Arnulf declined.

The Robertine Odo, Count of Paris, was eventually made king. Odo and Baldwin's relationship deteriorated when Odo failed to support Baldwin's attempts to gain control of the Abbey of St. Bertin. Odo attacked Baldwin at Bruges but was unable to prevail. Baldwin continued his expansion to the south and gained control over Artois, including the important Abbey of St. Vaast.

Marriage 
Between 893 and 899, Baldwin II married Ælfthryth (or Elftrude or Elfrida), the daughter of King Alfred the Great of Wessex. The immediate goal of that Anglo-Flemish alliance was to help Baldwin control the lower Canche River valley. They had four children: Count Arnulf I of Flanders (c. 890–964), Count Adalulf of Boulogne (c. 890–933), Ealswid, and Ermentrud.

Death

When the Abbey came under the jurisdiction of Archbishop Fulk of Reims in 900, Baldwin had the archbishop assassinated and was excommunicated by Pope Benedict IV. When his attempts to expand further into the upper Somme River valley were opposed by Herbert I, Count of Vermandois, Baldwin had the count assassinated as well. Baldwin died on 10 September 918, at Blandijnberg (near Ghent) and was succeeded by his eldest son, Arnulf I of Flanders. His younger son, Adalulf, became the first Count of Boulogne.

Family

Baldwin II was married to Ælfthryth, daughter of Alfred the Great, and had children:

Arnulf I of Flanders (c. 893/99–964/65); married Adela of Vermandois
Adalulf, Count of Boulogne (c. 893/99 – 933)
Ealswid
Ermentrud

References

Sources

Additional references
 Folcwine. Gesta Abbatum S. Bertini Sithiensium.
 

860s births
918 deaths
Year of birth uncertain
9th-century people from West Francia
10th-century people from West Francia
Frankish warriors
House of Flanders
Baldwin 2
Baldwin 1
People excommunicated by the Catholic Church